Be Gentle is a studio album by Filipino singer-actress Nora Aunor, released in 1972 by Alpha Records Corporation in the Philippines in LP format and later released in 1999 in a compilation/ cd format.   The album contains 12 tracks among them is  the original composition of Danny Holmsen "And God Smiled at Me" which was also the title of Nora Aunor's Award winning movie.

Track listing

Side One

Side Two

Album credits 

Arranged and conducted by:

 Danny Holmsen
 Be Gentle
 Anticipation
 Ang God SMiled at Me
 Gift of Love
 I Made a Mistake
Everyday of my LIfe
Go My Heart
What the use of Loving You

Arranged and conducted by:

 Doming Valdez
Oh My Love
Mister Cloud

Arranged and conducted by:

 The Blinkers
 Alone Again (Naturally)
 You are Everything

Recording supervisor

 Gil Cruz

Back up
 The Philamlife Choral Group

Recording engineers
 Ric L. Santos
 Boy Roxas

Recorded at
 CAI Studios

Original cover design
 J.E.M. Gonzales

See also
 Nora Aunor discography

References 

Nora Aunor albums
1972 albums